Khallikote is a town and a Notified Area Council in Ganjam district in the Indian state of Odisha.

Geography

Demographics
 India census, Khalikote had a population of 10,959. Males constitute 52% of the population and females 48%. Khalikote has an average literacy rate of 67%, higher than the national average of 59.5%: male literacy is 77%, and female literacy is 55%. In Khalikote, 12% of the population is under 6 years of age.

Politics
Current MLA from Khallikote Assembly Constituency is Smt. Suryamani Baidya who won the seat in State election in 2019.

Prior to him V.Sugyani Kumari Deo of BJD, who won the seat in State elections in 2004 and also in 2000, in 1995 representing JD, in 1990 representing JD, in 1985 representing JNP and in 1977 representing JNP. Trinath Samantary of INC(I) was MLA from this seat in 1980.

Khallikote is part of Aska (Lok Sabha constituency).

Climate and regional setting
Maximum summer temperature is 37 °C; minimum winter temperature is 16 °C. The mean daily temperature varies from 33 °C to 38 °C. May is the hottest month; December is the coldest. The average annual rainfall is 1250 mm and the region receives monsoon and torrential rainfall from July to October.

References

Cities and towns in Ganjam district